Kje (Ќ ќ; italics: Ќ ќ) is a letter of the Cyrillic script, used only in the Macedonian alphabet, where it represents the voiceless palatal plosive , or the voiceless alveolo-palatal affricate . Kje is the 24th letter in this alphabet.

For example, Macedonian ноќ (noḱ, night) corresponds to Serbo-Croatian ноћ/noć, and Bulgarian нощ (nosht). The common surname ending -ić is spelled -иќ in Macedonian.

Related letters and other similar characters
Ḱ ḱ : Latin letter K with acute
Ķ ķ : Latin letter K with cedilla
К к : Cyrillic letter Ka
Ћ ћ: Cyrillic letter Tshe
Ѓ ѓ : Cyrillic letter Gje
Ť ť : Latin letter T with caron

Computing codes

See also
 Iotation

External links

References